José Eduardo Argumedo Barraza (born 14 October 1988) is a Mexican professional boxer who held the IBF mini flyweight title from 2015 to 2017.

Career
Argumedo worked as a baker and a taquero prior to becoming a boxer. He was trained by Lorenzo Bermúdez as an amateur and as a professional by Eddie Reynoso, the latter also trains Canelo Álvarez. As an amateur, Argumedo medaled at the National Olympiad. Argumedo currently owns a taquería in his hometown of Tepic. Argumedo made his pro debut on August 27, 2010, losing to Oswaldo Novoa on points. Argumedo later avenged the loss to Novoa, beating him by majority decision on January 21, 2011, improving his record to 2–1. Argumedo won his first professional title, the WBC light flyweight title, by defeating Saúl Juárez via unanimous decision in 2012. Argumedo built a lead on the early rounds, and survived Juárez's body attack in the second half of the fight to secure the win.

Agumedo defeated Katsunari Takayama by split technical decision to win the IBF mini flyweight title on December 31, 2015. Takayama suffered a cut due to an accidental headbutt in the second round and another one on the ninth round, after the latter Takayama was deemed unable to continue and the fight went to the scorecards. Argumedo was ahead 87–84 on two of them, and Takayama was ahead 86–85 on the third, giving Argumedo the win and the title. In July 2016, Argumedo comfortably outboxed and decisioned Julio Mendoza to notch his first title defense in his hometown. Argumedo made a second defense in 2016, defeating Jose Jimenez by technical knockout on round 3, having dropped him twice in that round.

Argumedo's third title defense came against Gabriel Mendoza. On round 8 of the fight, Mendoza sustained a cut over his left eye and the doctor ruled him unable to continue, giving Argumedo the win by technical knockout. After the fight, Reynoso mentioned Argumedo's next title defense would take place in Japan. Hiroto Kyoguchi was Argumedo's next challenger. Prior to the fight, Kyoguchi stated that Argumedo was vulnerable to consistent body punching. Argumedo missed weight prior to the bout, and was stripped of his belt. Nevertheless, Kyoguchi claimed the title, beating Argumedo by unanimous decision in a clinch-heavy fight. Kyoguchi scored a knockdown with a left hand with 40 seconds left on round 9, Argumedo was able to survive until the break despite Kyoguchi throwing a flurry of punches.

Professional boxing record

See also
List of IBF world champions
List of Mexican boxing world champions

References

External links

Living people
1988 births
Mini-flyweight boxers
World mini-flyweight boxing champions
International Boxing Federation champions
Mexican male boxers
Boxers from Nayarit
Sportspeople from Tepic, Nayarit